Pseudolaguvia ferula is a species of sisorid catfish from the Tista River in West Bengal, India.

References

Catfish of Asia
Fish of India
Taxa named by Heok Hee Ng
Fish described in 2006
Erethistidae